Madrasta (International title: A Place in Your Heart /  ) is a Philippine television drama series broadcast by GMA Network. Directed by Monti Puno Parungao, it stars Arra San Agustin in the title role. It premiered on October 7, 2019 on the network's Afternoon Prime line up replacing Dahil sa Pag-ibig. The series concluded on February 21, 2020 with a total of 100 episodes. It was replaced by Bilangin ang Bituin sa Langit in its timeslot.

The series is streaming online on YouTube.

Premise
Audrey Segundo, who almost gives up on her aspirations after getting sent back to the Philippines meets Sean Ledesma, whom will be abandoned by his wife, Katharine Viduya and their kids. Audrey will help him move on and they will eventually fall in love. Katherine will eventually return in Sean's life to get his money, which will lead to the clash between Katherine and Audrey.

Cast and characters

Lead cast
 Arra San Agustin as Audrey Segundo-Ledesma / Rachel Cruz

Supporting cast
 Juancho Trivino as Sean Ledesma
 Thea Tolentino as Katharine Viduya-Ledesma / Kara Santos / Sylvia
 Gladys Reyes as Elizabeth Ledesma
 Manilyn Reynes as Grace Segundo
 Almira Muhlach as Shirley Viduya
 Phytos Ramirez as David Generoso
 Divine Aucina as Deborah "Debbie" Torres
 Ahron Villena as Gian Fontanos
 Isabelle de Leon as Judy Villas
 Kelvin Miranda as Barry Segundo
 Faye Lorenzo as Joan
 Anjo Damiles as George

Guest cast
 Alice Dixson as Angelina Cruz
 Zachie Rivera as Lauren V. Ledesma 
 Jom Manzala as Timothy V. Ledesma
 Herlene Budol as Sandy Escudero
 Kristina Paner as Rita
 Sue Prado as Beth
 Kevin Sagra as Jason
 Bryan Benedict as Elvis
 Jeremy Sabido as Gareth

Ratings
According to AGB Nielsen Philippines' Nationwide Urban Television Audience Measurement People in Television Homes, the final episode of Madrasta earned a 7.5% rating.

Accolades

References

External links
 
 

2019 Philippine television series debuts
2020 Philippine television series endings
Filipino-language television shows
GMA Network drama series
Television shows set in the Philippines